Dead leaf mantis is a common name given to various species of praying mantis that mimic dead leaves.  It is most often used in reference to species within genus Deroplatys because of their popularity as exotic pets.  Examples include D. desiccata (giant dead leaf mantis), D. lobata (Southeast Asian dead leaf mantis), and D. philippinica (Philippines dead leaf mantis). Other species to which the term may apply include Acanthops falcataria (South American dead leaf mantis), A. falcata (South American dead leaf mantis), and Phyllocrania paradoxa (more common known as the ghost mantis).

See also

Flower mantis
Leaf mantis
Shield mantis
Grass mantis
Stick mantis
Acanthops
List of mantis genera and species

References

Mantodea
Insect common names